Oymaklı is a village in the Gerger District, Adıyaman Province, Turkey. The village is populated by Turks and had a population of 343 in 2021.

The hamlets of Başmakçı, İndere, Onbaşılar, Varlık and Yağlıca are attached to Oymaklı.

References

Villages in Gerger District